Phytoecia capensis is a species of beetle in the family Cerambycidae. It was described by Péringuey in 1888. It is known from South Africa.

References

Phytoecia
Beetles described in 1888